Matacon station is a railway station located on the South Main Line in Albay, Philippines. It is still use for the Bicol Commuter.

Philippine National Railways stations
Railway stations in Albay